Marvel Spotlight is a comic book anthology series published by Marvel Comics as a try-out book. It stood out from Marvel's other try-out books in that most of the featured characters made their first appearance in the series. The series originally ran for 33 issues from November 1971 to April 1977. A second volume ran for 11 issues from July 1979 to March 1981.

Publication history 
Marvel Spotlight was one of three tryout books proposed by Stan Lee after he transitioned from being Marvel Comics' writer and editor to its president and publisher, the others being Marvel Feature and Marvel Premiere. The advantage of such tryout books was that they allowed the publisher to assess a feature's popularity without the marketing investment required to launch a new series, and without the blow to the publisher's image with readers if the new series immediately failed.

The series began with a Red Wolf story. Editor Roy Thomas explained: "Stan [Lee] and I decided it'd be a good idea to have a book with an American Indian hero. ... Stan didn't want it as a modern-day character. I guess he was trying to see if he could find a way to get a Western to sell, because everybody in the field wanted to write or draw a Western". Following this successful try-out, Red Wolf was given his own series, as were Werewolf by Night, Ghost Rider, the Son of Satan, and Spider-Woman.

In addition to launching new series, Marvel Spotlight hosted some significant stories with established characters. Issue #31 provided a retroactive explanation for why Nick Fury (inextricably associated with World War II due to his starring role in Sgt. Fury and his Howling Commandos) remained so youthful, in the form of an experimental longevity serum. After a run of nearly six years, the series ended with Marvel Spotlight #33 (April 1977).

The series was revived in 1979, initially as simply a place to publish inventory stories from the recently cancelled Captain Marvel. However, once these leftover tales were exhausted, the series went on to feature other characters. Tako Shamara first appeared in Marvel Spotlight vol. 2 #5 (March 1980), in a story by Marv Wolfman and Steve Ditko. In his first appearance the character battled a huge dragon from the past called a Wani, a monster that destroyed his ancestors' villages in 1582. The creature that Tako battled was intended to be Godzilla but since Marvel no longer had the rights to the character, which lapsed the previous year, the creature was modified to a dragon called The Wani. Issue #8 featured the final Captain Marvel solo story before the character's death.

The second volume was cancelled after just 11 issues. In contrast to the original series, only one issue (#5) featured a new character, and none of them led to the featured character getting their own series. Jim Salicrup, who edited and/or did cover copy on most of the second volume, said that he was excited about reviving Marvel Spotlight, but that "it was probably a mistake to launch a new title with material from a recently canceled comic. I suspect that as an editor, I was hoping to give Captain Marvel another chance, but sometimes it's better to let things go. As a result, for the most part, the series seemed to exist just to burn off existing inventory".

In December 2005, the Marvel Spotlight title was used for a series of comic book-sized magazines, usually featuring profiles of and interviews with Marvel creators (one writer and one artist each issue), or spotlighting special Marvel projects such as Stephen King's The Dark Tower.

The issues

Volume 1 (November 1971 – April 1977)

Volume 2 (July 1979 – March 1981)

Collected editions 
 Essential Werewolf by Night Vol 1 includes Marvel Spotlight #2–4, 576 pages, October 2005,  
 Essential Ghost Rider Vol. 1 includes Marvel Spotlight #5–12, 560 pages, December 2006,  
 Essential Marvel Horror 
 Vol. 1 includes Marvel Spotlight #12–24, 648 pages, October 2006,  
 Vol. 2 includes Marvel Spotlight #26, 616 pages, November 2008,  
 Essential Moon Knight Vol. 1 includes Marvel Spotlight #28–29, 560 pages, February 2006,  
 Siege Prelude includes Marvel Spotlight #30, 264 pages, January 2010,  
 Essential Spider-Woman Vol. 1 includes Marvel Spotlight #32, 576 pages, December 2005,  
 Marvel Masterworks: Deathlok Vol. 1 includes Marvel Spotlight #33, 368 pages, November 2009,

See also 
 Marvel Premiere

References

External links
 
 

1971 comics debuts
1977 comics endings
1979 comics debuts
1981 comics endings
Comics anthologies
Comics by Archie Goodwin (comics)
Comics by Gerry Conway
Comics by Marv Wolfman
Comics by Steve Ditko
Comics by Steve Gerber
Defunct American comics